Vasum omanicum is an extinct species of medium to large sea snail, a marine gastropod mollusk in the family Turbinellidae.

Description

Distribution
Fossils of this marine species have been found in Miocene strata in Oman (age range: 28.4 to 23.03 Ma)

References

External links
 Harzhauser, M. (2007). Oligocene and Aquitanian Gastropod Faunas from the Sultanate of Oman and their biogeographic implications for the early western Indo-Pacific. Palaeontographica Abteilung A. 280(4-6): 75-121

omanicum
Gastropods described in 2007